The Fugitive is a 1933 American Western film directed by Harry L. Fraser and starring Rex Bell, Cecilia Parker and Bob Kortman.

Synopsis
A cowboy wrongly accused of a crime has to go on the run from the law until he can clear his name.

Cast
 Rex Bell as Joe Kean
 Cecilia Parker as Georgia Stevens
 Bob Kortman as Dutch Walton 
 George 'Gabby' Hayes as Judge Tyler 
 Tom London as om - Foreman
 Gordon De Main as Nicholson 
 Theodore Lorch as Parker
 Earl Dwire as Henchman Spike
 George Nash as Kansas

References

Bibliography
 Pitts, Michael R. Western Movies: A Guide to 5,105 Feature Films. McFarland, 2012.

External links
 

1933 films
1933 Western (genre) films
1930s English-language films
American Western (genre) films
Films directed by Harry L. Fraser
Monogram Pictures films
1930s American films